Diştaş is a village in Mut district of Mersin Province, Turkey. It is situated in the valley of Göksu River . The population of the village is 563 as of 2018.

References

Villages in Mut District